Meadowthorpe is a neighborhood in western Lexington, Kentucky, United States. Its boundaries are Leestown Road to the south, New Circle Road to the west, and Norfolk Southern railroad tracks to the north and east. Since 2000, areas south of Leestown Road have seen residential and commercial development in Townley Center.  This area is not a part of the Meadowthorpe neighborhood. Schools in the area are Meadowthorpe Elementary and Leestown Middle School.

Neighborhood statistics
 Area: 
 Population: 1,460
 Population density: 2,983 people per square mile (1,149.6/km2)
 Median household income: $47,217

References

Neighborhoods in Lexington, Kentucky